Top Model, cycle 10 is the tenth cycle of an ongoing reality television series based on Tyra Banks' America's Next Top Model that pits contestants from Poland against each other in a variety of competitions to determine who will win the title of the next Polish Top Model.

Joanna Krupa, who also serves as the lead judge, returned to host the tenth cycle. Other judges included fashion designer Dawid Woliński, fashion show director Kasia Sokołowska and photographer Marcin Tyszka. This is the seventh season of the show to feature male contestants.

Among the prizes for the season were a contract with Models Plus Management, an appearance on the cover of the Polish issue of Glamour, and 100,000 złotys (US$30,000).

The international destinations for this cycle are Prague and Malé. The winner of the competition was 20 year-old Dominika Wysocka, from Koszalin.

Contestants 
(Ages stated are at start of contest)

Episodes

Episode 1
Original airdate: 

Auditions for the tenth season of Top Model begin, and aspiring hopefuls are chosen for the semi-final round.

Silver ticket winner: Anna Szczepańska

Episode 2
Original airdate: 

In the semi-finals, the judges begin to eliminate contestants to narrow the number of models who will battle it out for a place in the top model house.

Golden ticket winner: Weronika Zoń

Episode 3
Original airdate: 

In the third and final casting episode of the season, the judges chose the finalists who will move onto the main competition out of the remaining pool of contestants.

Episode 4
Original airdate: 

Challenge winners: Julia Sobczyńska, Kacper Orenkiewicz, Nicole Akonchong & Mikołaj Krawiecki
First call-out: Weronika Zoń
Bottom three: Arek Pydych, Kacper Orenkiewicz, & Ola Skubis
Eliminated: Kacper Orenkiewicz
Featured photographer: Marcin Tyszka
Guest judge: Robert Kupisz

Episode 5
Original airdate: 

First challenge winners: Julia Sobczyńska
Second challenge winners: Mikołaj Krawiecki, Julia Sobczyńska, Kacper Jasiński, Olga Król, Ola Skubis
First call-out: Adam Lochyński & Nicole Akonchong
Bottom three: Bartek Kloch, Dominika Wysocka & Wiktoria Pawliszewska
Eliminated: Bartek Kloch
Featured photographer: Natasza Parzymies
Guest judge: Marta Dyks, Natasza Parzymies

Episode 6
Original airdate: 

Challenge winners: Arek Pydych & Weronika Zoń
First call-out: Dominika Wysocka
Bottom three: Mikołaj Krawiecki, Olga Król & Wiktoria Pawliszewska
Eliminated: Wiktoria Pawliszewska
Featured photographer: Marcin Tyszka & Marta Wojtal
Guest judge: Joanna Koroniewska

Episode 7
Original airdate: 

Challenge winners: Julia Sobczyńska, Kacper Jasiński & Sophia Mokhar
First call-out: Mikołaj Krawiecki
Bottom three: Olga Król, Sophia Mokhar & Weronika Zoń
Eliminated: Olga Król
Featured director: Ralph Kaminski
Guest judge:  Ralph Kaminski, Dominik Sadoch

Episode 8
Original airdate: 

First call-out: Julia Sobczyńska
Bottom three: Łukasz Wasielewski, Ola Skubis & Sophia Mokhar
Eliminated: Łukasz Wasielewski & Ola Skubis
Featured photographer: Magdalena Luniewska
Guest judge: Julia Banaś

Episode 9
Original airdate: 

Quit: Sophia Mokhar
Returned: Ola Skubis
First challenge winners: Julia Sobczyńska,  Kacper Jasiński & Weronika Zoń
Second challenge winners: Kacper Jasiński
First call-out: Mikołaj Krawiecki
Bottom three: Adam Lochyński, Kacper Jasiński & Weronika Zoń
Eliminated: Adam Lochyński
Guest judge: Kasia Dąbrowska
Featured photographer: Zosia Promińska & Marcin Tyszka
Special guests: Anna Piszczałka (Cycle 1), Olga Kaczyńska (Cycle 2), Zuzanna Kołodziejczyk (Cycle 3), Mateusz Maga (Cycle 4), Karolina Pisarek (Cycle 5), Patryk Grudowicz (Cycle 6), Kasia Szklarczyk (Cycle 7), Dawid Woskanian (Cycle 8) & Mikołaj Śmieszek (Cycle 9)

Episode 10
Original airdate: 

First challenge winner: Nicole Akonchong
Second challenge winner: Nicole Akonchong & Dominika Wysocka
First call-out: Julia Sobczyńska
Bottom three: Arek Pydych, Dominika Wysocka & Ola Skubis
Eliminated: Arek Pydych & Ola Skubis
Featured photographer: Mateusz Nasternak, Agnieszka Kulesza & Łukasz Pik
Guest judge: Ashlee Barrett-Bourmier

Episode 11
Original airdate: 

Challenge winner: Weronika Zoń & Mikołaj Krawiecki
First call-out: Nicole Akonchong
Bottom three: Julia Sobczyńska, Kacper Jasiński & Weronika Zoń
Eliminated: Kacper Jasiński & Weronika Zoń
Saved: Kacper Jasiński
Featured photographer: Standa Merhout
Guest judge: Daniela Pestova
Special Guests: Jan Smejkal, Alexandra, Gnidiakova, Vanda Janda, Boris Kral, Tomas Nemec, Michael Kovacik, Daniela Pilna, Zdenka Rezkova, Petra Kubikova, Pavol Dendis, Antonin Soukup

Episode 12
Original airdate: 

First call-out: Nicole Akonchong
Bottom three: Dominika Wysocka, Kacper Jasiński & Mikołaj Krawiecki
Eliminated: Kacper Jasiński & Mikołaj Krawiecki
Featured photographer: Marcin Tyszka
Guest judge: Vanda Janda
Special Guests: Adela Lastovkova Stodolova, Boris Kral, Barbora Michnova, Zdenka Rezkova, Daniela Pilna, Michael Kovacik, Hana Kohoutova, Jana Kapounová, Michaela Kocianová

Episode 13
Original airdate: 

Final three: Dominika Wysocka, Julia Sobczyńska & Nicole Akonchong
Eliminated: Julia Sobczyńska
Final two: Dominika Wysocka & Nicole Akonchong
Poland's Next Top Model: Dominika Wysocka
Featured photographer: Marcin Klaban & Dorota Szulc
Guest judge: Monika "Jac" Jagaciak
Special Guests: Michał "Fox" Krol, Brodka, Smolasty, Anna Piszczałka (Cycle 1), Joanna Kudzbalska (Cycle 2), Zuzanna Kołodziejczyk (Cycle 3), Osuenhe Ugonoh (Cycle 4), Karolina Pisarek (Cycle 5), Patryk Grudowicz (Cycle 6), Kasia Szklarczyk (Cycle 7), Olga Kleczkowska (Cycle 8) & Patrycja Sobolewska (Cycle 9)

Results 

 The contestant quit the competition
 The contestant was immune from elimination.
 The contestant was originally eliminated but was saved
 The contestant was eliminated.

Bottom Two/Three/Four 

 The contestant was eliminated after their first time in the bottom two
 The contestant was eliminated after their second time in the bottom two
 The contestant was eliminated after their third time in the bottom two
 The contestant quit the competition
 The contestant was eliminated in the final judging and placed third.
 The contestant was eliminated in the final judging and placed second.

Photo shoots
Episode 3 photo shoot: Group shots (semifinals)
Episode 4 photo shoot: Posing on a rotating wheel
Episode 5 video shoot : Romance in a library
Episode 6 photo shoot: Nude shoot with fabric
Episode 7 video shoot: Fashion film by Ralph Kaminski
Episode 8 photo shoot: Slavic Myths
Episode 9 photo shoot: Fashion athletes
Episode 10 photo shoot: Vogue Polska editorial
Episode 11 photo shoot: Posing on a helicopter
Episode 12 photo shoots: Marble theater; Streets of Prague
Episode 13 photo shoots: Glamour covers, Apart Jewelry campaign

Ratings

References

 

Top Model (Polish TV series)
2018 in Polish television